Zonaria is a Swedish death metal band.

Zonaria may also refer to:

 Zonaria (alga), a genus of thalloid brown alga
 Zonaria (gastropod), a genus of marine gastropod mollusks